Blace Gaston Alexander Brown (born May 29, 1996) is a Canadian football cornerback for the Saskatchewan Roughriders of the Canadian Football League (CFL). He played college football at Troy. He is the nephew of Heisman Trophy winner Herschel Walker.

Early life and education
Blace Brown was born on May 29, 1996 in Conyers, Georgia. He went to high school at Cherokee High School. Brown went to college at Troy. He was redshirted in 2015. He had 6 interceptions in 2016. In 2017, he was named to the First Team All-Sun belt with 5 interceptions. Brown tore his ACL in their conference championship game at Arkansas State later that year. He played in all 12 games and had 44 tackles in his senior year. He finished the year with second-team all-Sun Belt honors.

Professional career
Brown went undrafted in the 2019 NFL Draft. He later signed with the Saskatchewan Roughriders of the Canadian Football League. He played in 2 games with them in his rookie season. He started one game, and had one tackle. In his second year in the league Brown played in nine games and contributed with 21 defensive tackles, one special teams tackle, one interception and one forced fumble. On June 5, 2022 he was released by the Riders as part of the teams training camp cutdowns. Brown re-signed with the Riders on July 12, 2022, partway through the 2022 season.

References

Living people
1996 births
Troy Trojans football players
Saskatchewan Roughriders players
Players of American football from Georgia (U.S. state)
Canadian football defensive backs